George Ffolliott Powell-Shedden,  (1 April 1916 – 31 October 1994) was a Royal Air Force pilot who flew during the Battle of Britain and later went on to operational commands. He was also an Olympic bobsledder who competed for Britain in the late 1940s.

Early life
Born George Ffolliott Powell on 1 April 1916 in Cowes on the Isle of Wight, he was the son of Lieutenant Colonel Richmond Ffolliott Powell DSO (1880–1956) and Alice Katherine Beatrix Shedden. Powell-Shedden was youngest of three brothers: Richmond Roscow Ffolliott Powell (born 1909); and Atherton George Ffolliott Powell (born 1912), who later became a lieutenant colonel in the Royal Welch Fusiliers. He had one sister, Rosemary Beatrix Ffolliot Powell. He assumed the surname of Powell-Shedden by deed poll of 9 August 1938.

Powell-Shedden was educated at Wellington College, where he became a sergeant in the Officers' Training Corps. After leaving school he entered the Royal Military Academy, Woolwich, but then switched to the Royal Air Force College Cranwell where he was commissioned on 19 December 1936.

Royal Air Force
In 1937 he was posted to No. 47 Squadron RAF, flying Vickers Vincent aircraft based at Khartoum. In 1939 he was transferred to No. 33 Squadron RAF, a fighter squadron equipped with Gloster Gladiator biplanes for policing Palestine.

Battle of Britain
During the Battle of Britain Powell-Shedden served as blue flight commander in Group Captain Douglas Bader's No. 242 Squadron RAF. Though somewhat large for a Hawker Hurricane cockpit, and having a stutter, Powell-Shedden was recommended to Bader as "a very good type".

Powell-Shedden joined the squadron June 1940. Powell-Shedden shot down at least four enemy aircraft.

On 15 September 1940, now known as Battle of Britain Day, it was reported that Powell-Shedden was missing. It transpired that he had shot down a Dornier bomber and was chasing another when a Messerschmitt Me 109 came out of cloud behind him and set his Hurricane on fire. While baling out he hit the tail and dislocated a shoulder.

After the Battle of Britain Powell-Shedden was sent to No. 258 Squadron RAF, another Hurricane squadron, as a flight commander; the next April he received his first command—that of No. 615 (County of Surrey) Squadron, an Auxiliary Air Force Hurricane squadron.

Malta
In July 1941 Powell-Shedden was posted to the island of Malta, where he formed the Malta Night Fighter Unit, a handful of Hurricanes working with searchlight and anti-aircraft gun crews.

Powell-Shedden was promoted to the rank of squadron leader in September 1941, and awarded the Distinguished Flying Cross in December. The citation read:

D-Day
In January 1944, after further courses and staff appointments, he resumed operational flying with No. 96 Squadron RAF, a Mosquito squadron, and then took command of No. 29 Squadron RAF, a Mosquito squadron specialising in low-level night intruder missions before and after D-Day. He was awarded a Bar to his Distinguished Service Order on 27 April 1945 for his leadership during many perilous missions with No. 100 (Bomber Support) Group.

Command appointments
In 1952 Powell-Shedden received command of RAF Jever in Germany and was promoted to the rank of group captain on 1 January 1954. From 1954 to 1957 served on the operational staff at Naples. He was posted to the Air Ministry in 1958, and retired from the RAF in 1961.

Bobsledding
Powell-Shedden was also a bobsledder who competed for Britain in the late 1940s. At the 1948 Winter Olympics in St. Moritz, he finished 15th in the four-man event, with teammates James Iremonger, Edgar Meddings and Richard Jeffrey.

Later life
Powell-Shedden retired in 1961 to join the Stock Exchange (Hoblyn & King) and to farm in Buckinghamshire. He was twice married, to Diana and Marietta, and had a son, Henry, and a daughter, Angela. He died on 31 October 1994 in London.

References

External links
British Olympic Association profile 

1916 births
1994 deaths
Bobsledders at the 1948 Winter Olympics
British male bobsledders
Companions of the Distinguished Service Order
Graduates of the Royal Air Force College Cranwell
Olympic bobsledders of Great Britain
People from Cowes
Recipients of the Distinguished Flying Cross (United Kingdom)
Royal Air Force officers
Royal Air Force personnel of World War II
The Few
Military personnel from the Isle of Wight